Michael "Mick"/"Mike" Harrison (birth unknown) is an English former professional rugby league footballer who played in the 1960s, 1970s and 1980s.

Playing career

International honours
Mick Harrison won caps for England while at Leeds in 1978 against France, and Wales, and won caps for Great Britain while at Hull in 1967 against France (2 matches), in 1971 against New Zealand (2 matches), in 1972 against France (2 matches), and in 1973 against Australia.

Challenge Cup Final appearances
Mick Harrison played left-, i.e. number 8, in Leeds' 16-7 victory over Widnes in the 1977 Challenge Cup Final during the 1976–77 season at Wembley Stadium, London on Saturday 7 May 1977, in front of a crowd of 80,871, and played left- in the 14-12 victory over St. Helens in the 1978 Challenge Cup Final during the 1977–78 season at Wembley Stadium, London on Saturday 13 May 1978, in front of a crowd of 96,000.

County Cup Final appearances
Mick Harrison played left-, i.e. number 8, in Hull FC's 7-8 defeat by Hull Kingston Rovers in the 1967 Yorkshire County Cup Final during the 1967–68 season at Headingley Rugby Stadium, Leeds on Saturday 14 October 1967, played left- in the 12-9 victory over Featherstone Rovers in the 1969 Yorkshire County Cup Final during the 1969–70 season at Headingley Rugby Stadium, Leeds on Saturday 20 September 1969, played left- in Leeds' 15-11 victory over Hull Kingston Rovers in the 1975 Yorkshire County Cup Final during the 1975–76 season at Odsal Stadium, Bradford on Saturday 15 November 1975, and played left- in the 8-7 victory over Hull Kingston Rovers in the 1980 Yorkshire County Cup Final during the 1980–81 season at Fartown Ground, Huddersfield on Saturday 8 November 1980.

John Player Trophy Final appearances
Mick Harrison played right-, i.e. number 3, in Hull FC's 12-4 victory over Hull Kingston Rovers in the 1981–82 John Player Trophy Final during the 1981–82 season at Headingley Rugby Stadium, Leeds on Saturday 23 January 1982.

References

External links
 (archived by web.archive.org) Stats → PastPlayers → H at hullfc.com
 (archived by web.archive.org) Statistics at hullfc.com

Living people
England national rugby league team players
English rugby league players
Great Britain national rugby league team players
Hull F.C. players
Leeds Rhinos players
Place of birth missing (living people)
Rugby league centres
Rugby league props
Year of birth missing (living people)